The Undisputed British Heavyweight Championship is a professional wrestling championship owned by the Revolution Pro Wrestling (RevPro/RPW) promotion. The title was created and debuted on 16 July 2005 and is the promotion's principal championship. The current champion is Great-O-Khan, who is in his first reign.

The current title was formed after the IPW:UK Championship and the All-England Championship were unified into the Undisputed British Heavyweight Championship, but later became known as simply the "British Heavyweight Championship" after RPW separated itself from International Pro Wrestling: United Kingdom (IPW:UK). The title has been defended in the United States and in Japan through RPW's working relationships with New Japan Pro-Wrestling (NJPW) and Ring of Honor (ROH). In 2018, the championship name was reverted to the "Undisputed British Heavyweight Championship".

Title history
Great-O-Khan is the current champion in his first reign. He defeated Zak Zodiac (who served as replacement for Ricky Knight Jr.) for the title on Uprising on 17 December 2022, in London, England.

Reigns

Combined reigns

See also
Professional wrestling in the United Kingdom
RPW Undisputed British Tag Team Championship
RPW British Cruiserweight Championship
IPW:UK All-England Championship
IPW:UK World Championship

References

External links

 RPW British Heavyweight Championship

Revolution Pro Wrestling championships
International Pro Wrestling: United Kingdom championships
Heavyweight wrestling championships
National professional wrestling championships
Professional wrestling in the United Kingdom